Makgill is a surname. Notable people with the surname include:

Clan Makgill, Lowland Scottish clan
George Makgill (1868–1926), Scottish novelist and right-wing propagandist
George Makgill, 13th Viscount of Oxfuird CBE (1934–2003), Scottish peer and Chief of the Makgill family
Ian Alexander Arthur Makgill, 14th Viscount of Oxfuird or Viscount of Oxfuird, title in the Peerage of Scotland
Robert Haldane Makgill (1870–1946), New Zealand surgeon, pathologist, military leader and public health administrator

See also
Magill
McGill (disambiguation)